A Skylark tower was a tower used for the launch of earlier versions of Skylark rockets. As Skylark rockets had no guidance system and accelerated slowly, they required a safe launch tower with a height of at least 24 metres, with its own guidance system. Later versions of the Skylark rocket were equipped with a more powerful engine and therefore did not need such a large guidance tower for launch.

Woomera
In 1956, a 30 metre tall swivelling launch tower was set up on launch site 2, at Woomera, South Australia. The tower was built of old Bailey bridge segments, each weighing 35 tons.

Salto di Quirra
At Salto di Quirra, Sardinia in 1965, a 30 metre tall Skylark tower was erected. The tower ceased to be in use from 1972, at which point launches moved to Esrange.  The tower remains today.

Esrange
At Esrange, Sweden in 1972, a 30 metre high Skylark tower was built.  The tower consists of a pyramid-like building with a launch tower on its top, in order to protect the rocket from cold before launch, necessary as Esrange is within the Arctic Circle. At launch, exhaust doors were opened to enable the smoke to leave the construct.

As Skylark rockets are no longer available, the Esrange Skylark launch tower was modified in 2005 for launching Brazilian VSB-30 rockets.  The tower is now used for launches of rockets manufactured in Brazil.

References 
 Description in DORADO, José M. Spain and the European Space Effort. Studies in Modern Science and Technology from the International Academy of the History of Science, Volume 5. Beauchesne. Paris, 2008, pp 75–119

External links
 European Space Agency: In Brief
 Skyscraper Page – features a diagram of the Woomera Skylark Tower
 Skyscraper Page – features a diagram of the Esrange Skylark Tower
 
 University of Leicester: The Skylark Sounding Rocket

Rocket launch sites